Anuario Filosófico is a triannual peer-reviewed academic journal of philosophy. It was established in 1968 and is published by the Philosophy Department of the University of Navarra in Spanish. The editor-in-chief is Montserrat Herrero of the same university.

Abstracting and indexing 
The journal is abstracted and indexed in:

References

External links
 
 

1968 establishments in Spain
Philosophy journals
Spanish-language journals
Publications established in 1968
University of Navarra
Triannual journals